William Michael Hubert Gibson (born 30 September 1990) is an English professional footballer who plays as a midfielder most recently for National League South club Wealdstone in the 2016–17 season.

Career

Watford
Gibson began a two-year academy scholarship with Watford in summer 2007. In 2007–08 he made 26 appearances for the under 18s, all of which were starts and making him the highest appearance maker for the Academy that season. He also scored three goals. He also made 12 appearances for the reserves, six of them starts, scoring three goals.

After appearing for Watford's first team during the 2008 pre-season, on 12 August 2008 he made his competitive debut whilst still an academy scholar. Part of a weakened side for the League Cup, Gibson came on as a 60th-minute substitute for Jon Harley. Playing on the left-wing, he set up Will Hoskins for the only goal of the game as Watford beat League One side Bristol Rovers.

In October 2008, along with Rob Kiernan and Ross Jenkins, Gibson signed a developmental contract, keeping him with Watford until the end of the 2009–10 season. A professional contract, it allowed the players to continue their scholarship without the pressure of worrying about their future. Although he did not appear again for the first team that season, he played 5 games for the reserves and made 10 starts for the Academy, scoring 4 goals.

On 15 December 2009 Gibson joined Isthmian Premier League side Wealdstone on a month-long loan. On his second appearance for the club, he scored both goals in a 2–1 victory over Wealdstone's local rivals Harrow Borough.

Yeovil Town
In July 2010, Gibson went for a trial with League One Yeovil Town. On 20 August 2010, he was signed on a short-term contract until December, a deal which was extended until the end of the season. He was informed by the club at the end of the 2010/11 season that he was one of seven Yeovil players who would be awarded new contracts.

On 22 March 2012, Gibson was sent out on loan to Conference National side Braintree Town until the end of the season. On 3 May 2012, it was announced that Gibson had been released by Yeovil Town.

Cambridge United
On 1 June 2012, Gibson signed a one-year contract with Conference National side Cambridge United becoming Jez George's fourth signing of the close season.

Career statistics

References

External links

Living people
1990 births
English footballers
Association football midfielders
English Football League players
Isthmian League players
National League (English football) players
Watford F.C. players
Wealdstone F.C. players
Yeovil Town F.C. players
Braintree Town F.C. players
Cambridge United F.C. players
Hemel Hempstead Town F.C. players
St Albans City F.C. players
Footballers from Harrow, London